La Roche-Bernard is a commune in the Morbihan department of Brittany in north-western France. Inhabitants of La Roche-Bernard are called in French Rochois for men and Rochoises for women.

Forming a part of Petites cités de caractère''', a quality label, the town is known for its marina along the waterfront of the river named Vilaine and also for its old area.

Geography

The town is located on the south part of Morbihan in Brittany.

History

Middle Ages

The town was founded in 919 by a Viking chief named Bern-hart''. He understood the interest of this strategic defensive place and he decided to fortify the area and settle here. His successors swore allegiance to the duke of Brittany.

During the 1341-1365 War of Succession, the baron decided to help Charles de Blois but at the end of the war, and after Charles de Blois's death, Jean de Montfort decided to destroy his castle.

Modern Times

In the 19th century, the town become an important dock with an apogee between 1880-1890 but the economic activity decreased quickly with the development of railway.

Today, La Roche-Bernard is a thriving yachting port with over five hundred private pleasure craft.

Heritage

The Old Area 

 Maritim museum of Vilaine river
 The house of Cannon (Town Hall)
 Notre-Dame Church
 Bouffay Piazza
 Quenelle Street
 Saulnerie Street

Natural sites 

 Vilaine river
 The Rock
 Garennes Garden

Bridges 

 The old bridge of La Roche-Bernard
 The Bridge of La Roche-Bernard
 The Bridge of Morbihan

See also
Communes of the Morbihan department
La Baule - Guérande Peninsula

References

External links

 Mayors of Morbihan Association 

Communes of Morbihan